The Public Relations Journal is an open-access peer-reviewed, electronic academic journal covering topics having to do with public relations and communication studies. It is published quarterly by the Public Relations Society of America. The editor-in-chief is Donald K. Wright (Boston University).

History 
The Public Relations Journal was established in 1945 by Rex F. Harlow (American Council on Public Relations). After this council and the National Association of Public Relations Counsel merged to form the Public Relations Society of America in 1947, it became a monthly publication of the latter society. It was published until 1994, after which it was superseded by two publications, the monthly PR Tactics and the quarterly The Strategist. However, the original Public Relations Journal had an editorial focus towards news, trends, and how-to information about the practice of public relations. The new journal is dedicated to the online publishing of research articles that examine public relations in depth and/or create, test, or expand public relations theory.

References

External links
 

Open access journals
Publications established in 1945
Quarterly journals
Business and management journals
English-language journals
1945 establishments in the United States